The High Commissioner of Malaysia to the Republic of Ghana is the head of Malaysia's diplomatic mission to Ghana. The position has the rank and status of an Ambassador Extraordinary and Plenipotentiary and is based in the High Commission of Malaysia, Accra.

List of heads of mission

High Commissioners to Ghana

See also
 Ghana–Malaysia relations

References 

 
Ghana
Malaysia